Nicole Stéphane (born Baroness Nicole de Rothschild, 27 May 1923 – 13 March 2007) was a French actress, producer and director.

Biography
The elder of the two daughters of Baron James-Henri de Rothschild and his first wife, Claude Dupont, Nicole Stéphane was a member of the Rothschild banking family of France. Her immediate family, however, also was deeply immersed in the arts. Her paternal grandfather, Baron Henri de Rothschild, was a playwright and theatrical producer who wrote under the names Charles des Fontaines and André Pascal and owned Théâtre Antoine and Théâtre Pigalle. Her first cousin Philippine de Rothschild was an actress with the Comédie-Française, using the name Philippine Pascal. And her father's brother, the vintner Philippe de Rothschild, wrote plays, owned theatres and produced films.

Stéphane joined the army during the Second World War, and was briefly imprisoned in Spain in 1942 after crossing the Pyrenées while she was trying to join the Free French. She was also a liaison agent in Germany. As an actress, she is best known for her role in two films by Jean-Pierre Melville, Le Silence de la mer (1949) and Les Enfants terribles (1950).

Her final film as an actress was the film Carve Her Name with Pride (1958). Her acting career was cut short by a car accident. She reoriented herself towards production, helping in particular Georges Franju and Jean-Pierre Melville. Among her production credits was Swann in Love (1984), an adaptation of the first novel in Marcel Proust's cycle Remembrance of Things Past that starred Jeremy Irons and Ornella Muti. She was also honoured as a member of Ordre des Arts et des Lettres by the government of France.
   
In the 1970s, Stéphane was the lover of the American writer and critic Susan Sontag. Sontag dedicated her 1977 book On Photography to her. She also had an affair with Colette de Jouvenel, daughter of the renowned author Colette.

She introduced her cousin Francine Weisweiller to Jean Cocteau, who she'd met while acting in the film of his novel Les Enfants Terribles. This led to Weisweiller becoming an important patron of his and living with him and Stéphane's Les Enfants Terribles costar Edouard Dermit in a menage a trois.

https://www.theguardian.com/news/2003/dec/18/guardianobituaries.film

Selected filmography 
 Actress
 Le Silence de la mer (1949) - La nièce 
 Les Enfants Terribles (1950) - Elisabeth
 Born of Unknown Father (1950) - Jacqueline Mussot
 The Unfrocked One (1954) - Catherine Grandpré
 Monsieur et Madame Curie (1956, Short) - Marie Curie / narrator
 Carve Her Name with Pride (1958) - Denise Bloch (final film role)

 Producer
 To Die in Madrid (Frédéric Rossif, 1962), Prix Jean Vigo 1963
 La Vie de château (Jean-Paul Rappeneau, 1965)
 L'Une et l'Autre (René Allio, 1967)
 Phèdre (Pierre Jourdan, 1968)
 Détruire, dit-elle (Marguerite Duras, 1969)
 Promised Lands (Susan Sontag, 1973)
 Sarah (Edgardo Cozarinsky, 1988)

 Director
 La Génération du désert (1958) (Short film)
 Une guerre pour une paix (1967) (Short film)
 En attendant Godot à Sarajevo (1993) (Short film)

Awards
1953 – Nominated BAFTA Film Award for Best Foreign Actress — Les Enfants terribles (1950)

References

External links

 

1923 births
2007 deaths
Chevaliers of the Ordre des Arts et des Lettres
Jewish French actresses
French baronesses
French women film directors
French film producers
Rothschild family
French lesbian actresses
LGBT film directors
LGBT film producers
20th-century French women